Hovea asperifolia is a species of flowering plant in the family Fabaceae and is endemic to south-eastern continental Australia. It is a shrub with hairy branchlets, narrowly oblong to narrowly linear leaves with stipules at the base, and mauve, pea-like flowers.

Description
The leaves are usually more or less glabrous, flat to arched either side of the mid-vein, and rough on the upper surface.

Taxonomy and naming
Hovea asperifolia was first formally described in 2001 by Ian R. Thompson in Australian Systematic Botany from specimens collected near Powelltown in 1983. Hovea asperifolia was previously included in H. pannosa.

In the same journal article, Thompson described two subspecies and the names are accepted by the Australian Plant Census:

Distribution and habitat
This species of pea grows in forest in hilly to mountainous country in south-eastern New South Wales, the Australian Capital Territory and eastern Victoria. Subspecies spinosissima is restricted to the ranges near Daylesford and Euroa in central Victoria.

References

asperifolia
Flora of the Australian Capital Territory
Flora of New South Wales
Flora of Victoria (Australia)
Fabales of Australia
Plants described in 2001